All Out War may refer to:

 All Out War (band), an American hardcore band
 All Out War (book), a 2016 book by Tim Shipman
 All Out War (album), a 2012 album by Incite
 All-Out War, a DC Comics publication
 All Out War, the title of the 20th and 21st volumes of The Walking Dead comic book series
 All Out War, the 1992 debut EP by Earth Crisis
 Total war, a war limitless in its scope
 Absolute war, a philosophical construct developed by von Clausewitz